Lowey is a surname. Notable people with the surname include:

Daniel Lowey (1875–1951), Olympic Tug of War competitor
Edmund Lowey (born 1938), Member of the Legislative Council in the Isle of Man
Hans Lowey, Austrian-American chemist
John Lowey (disambiguation), multiple people
Nita Lowey (born 1937), politician from the U.S. state of New York
Susan Lowey, American biophysicist

See also
Lowey of Tonbridge, the large tract of land given to Richard Fitz Gilbert (1024–1090), in West Kent, England by William the Conqueror after the Norman conquest of England.